Olga Catherine Mary Elizabeth Hegedus (18 October 1920 – 22 April 2017) was an English cellist who was co-principal of the English Chamber Orchestra. She performed at the wedding of Prince Charles and Lady Diana Spencer.

References

English cellists
1920 births
2017 deaths
Musicians from London
English people of Hungarian descent
British classical cellists
British women classical cellists
20th-century classical musicians
20th-century cellists